Blackford is a locality within the Kingston District Council in the Limestone Coast region of South Australia.

The locality boundaries include the Mount Scott Conservation Park.

Most of the Hundred of Murrabinna is contained in the locality of Blackford. The northern boundary is coincident, but the locality extends east and west beyond the hundred into the hundreds of Minecrow and Lacepede respectively and the southern end of the hundred of Murrabinna is in the boundaries of the locality of Reedy Creek.

References

Limestone Coast